Justice Hough may refer to:

Benson W. Hough (1875–1935), associate justice of the Supreme Court of Ohio
Warwick Hough (1836–1915), associate justice and chief justice of the Supreme Court of Missouri